Ryszard Przygodzki (born 2 April 1957) is a former Polish footballer who played as a midfielder. Przygodzki made a total of 127 appearances and scored 19 goals in Poland's top division.

Biography

Born in Bydgoszcz, Przygodzki started playing football with local side BKS Bydgoszcz, eventually moving to II liga side Odra Wodzisław Śląski. He stayed playing with Odra until 1983 when he transferred to Top division side Szombierki Bytom. With Szombierki he made 22 appearances and scored 2 goals in the I liga, leaving the club at the end of the season after the team finished bottom in the league. He transferred to Bałtyk Gdynia, making his Bałtyk debut on 25 August 1984 against GKS Katowice. Przygodzki spent two seasons with Bałtyk, making a combined total of 54 appearances and scoring 11 goals in the I liga. After Bałtyk were relegated in his second season Przygodzki joined Lechia Gdańsk. He made his Lechia debut on 3 August 1986 against Zagłębie Lubin.

Przygodzki spent two seasons with Lechia in the I liga, making a further 51 appearances and scoring 6 more goals in Poland's top division, before being relegated from the league for a third time. His final season was spent with Lechia in the II liga before he retired. In total he made 74 appearances and scored 9 goals in all competitions for Lechia.

References 

1957 births
Living people
Polish footballers
Szombierki Bytom players
Bałtyk Gdynia players
Lechia Gdańsk players
Association football midfielders